The 1925 Marquette Golden Avalanche football team was an American football team that represented Marquette University as an independent during the 1925 college football season. In its fourth season under head coach Frank Murray, the team compiled a 7–2 record.

Schedule

References

Marquette
Marquette Golden Avalanche football seasons
Marquette Golden Avalanche football